Robert J. Kuntz (born September 23, 1955) is a game designer and author of role-playing game publications.  He is best known for his contributions to various Dungeons & Dragons-related materials.

Biography

Early life
Rob Kuntz was born September 23, 1955 in Lake Geneva, Wisconsin. His older brother is Terry Kuntz. Kuntz learned about miniature wargames at age 13 while skimming through an issue of Playboy; he saw a game called Dogfight listed in a section describing party gifts for Christmas. Kuntz began playing boardgames, miniatures and play-by-mail games. Kuntz met Gary Gygax in 1968.

In November 1972, Dave Arneson and Dave Megarry traveled to Lake Geneva to meet with Gary Gygax, to provide a demonstration of Blackmoor and Dungeon! While meeting at Gygax's house, Dave Arneson ran the Lake Geneva gamers through their first session of Blackmoor. Rob Kuntz describes Dave Arneson as the referee, and the Lake Geneva players as being Gary Gygax, Ernie Gygax, Terry Kuntz, and himself. Kuntz describes Dave Megarry as the de facto leader of the group, as he understood the Blackmoor game and campaign world. In Wargaming magazine, Rob Kuntz wrote a short summary of their first Blackmoor session:

In 1972, at age 17 Kuntz lived just a few blocks away from Gygax, and got to play in the second-ever game of Dungeons & Dragons set in the World of Greyhawk, taking on the role of a fighter named Robilar. In 1973, Kuntz began running his own "Castle El Raja Key" campaign for Gygax. His campaign world was known as Kalibruhn. By 1974, the group of D&D players sometimes included over 20 people, so Kuntz became the co-dungeon-master, allowing each dungeon master to referee groups of only a dozen players. Kuntz brought in some elements of his campaign into Greyhawk, and some levels of El Raja Key were incorporated directly into Castle Greyhawk.

TSR
After Gygax formed TSR in 1973 and was hired as the company's first full-time employee in mid-1975, he was soon followed by Rob Kuntz, Terry Kuntz, Tim Kask, and Dave Megarry. Kuntz was TSR's sixth employee and was initially hired to do shipping; because of the small size of the company, everyone got to do some design work, including the Greyhawk supplement (1975). Kuntz also co-authored Gods, Demi-Gods & Heroes (1976) with James M. Ward. That same year Kuntz, along with Gygax and Brad Stock, redeveloped Fritz Leiber and Harry Fischer’s personal wargame Lankhmar for publication by TSR. His short fiction story "The Quest for the Vermillion Volume" appeared in The Strategic Review Vol. II #1 (February, 1976), and was the first fiction published by TSR. Gygax credits Kuntz with "substantial ideas" in Expedition to the Barrier Peaks (1980), which was originally run at Origins II in 1976. Kuntz served in the company in many positions, as designer, editor, Director of Shipping, columnist for the Dragon Magazine, Convention Chairman (Gen Con VIII & IX and Winter Fantasy 1) and oversaw the AD&D line's licensing to Judges Guild for a short time period.

As a D&D player, Kuntz developed the character of Robilar, the first character to successfully complete Tomb of Horrors, among other exploits.  Because of Kuntz' imaginative play of this character, Gary Gygax awarded him co-Dungeon Master status for Gygax's original Greyhawk home campaign.

As Gygax's friend and co-DM, Kuntz influenced the development of the Greyhawk milieu.  For example, Gygax adapted Kuntz' dark god "Tharzduun" into the entity known today as Tharizdun.  The names of the characters Tzunk and Bilarro are anagrams for his or his character's names.

Kuntz has authored or co-authored several  D&D publications, including the first edition of Deities & Demigods.

Kuntz wanted to move entirely to design and write a supplement based on his world of Kalibruhn; as a result of the company's refusal to let him become more involved in the creative side of things, Kuntz left TSR in 1977. Over the next several years, Kuntz went to college and got married. When Gygax was expanding Greyhawk in the early 1980s, he brought in Eric Shook and Kuntz to help manage the new work; Kuntz was happy to return to TSR to do creative work. Kuntz designed a two-part tournament adventure that he had first run in college, called "The Maze of Xaene", set in Greyhawk's Great Kingdom, focusing on its king Ivid V; James Ward ran the adventure in the D&D tournament at EastCon in 1982, but the adventure did not see print at TSR. Kuntz designed the board game "King of the Tabletop" with Tom Wham for publication in Dragon #77 (September 1983). Kuntz authored WG5: Mordenkainen's Fantastic Adventure (1984), drawn from some of his early adventures. Kuntz continued to play and participated as a judge in Gygax's Greyhawk campaign until Gygax closed it down following his exit from TSR.

Creations Unlimited and New Infinities
Kuntz left TSR when Gygax was forced out, and was very protective of his IP, not having signed the rights to Kalibruhn over to anyone. Kuntz created his own company to hold and protect his game world and other creations, and thus formed Creations Unlimited in 1986. The company produced a linked set of four adventures: The Maze of Zayene, Part 1: Prisoners of the Maze (1987), The Maze of Zayene Part 2: Dimensions of Flight (1987), The Maze of Zayene, Part 3: Tower Chaos (1987) and The Maze of Zayene, Part 4: The Eight Kings (1987); Kuntz created the first two adventures while he was at college, and had subsequently run them at EastCon in 1983. The company's fifth and final publication was Garden of the Plantmaster (1987); Kuntz had other publications planned for Creations Unlimited, the first of which was to be RPGA tournament adventure "(To the) City of Brass", followed by "Hidden Realms of Zayene", but Creations Unlimited never printed any of these.

Kuntz contributed a pair of adventures to TSR's Fate of Istus (1989), one of which included a lich named "Xaene the Accursed". By 1988, New Infinities Productions' "Fantasy Master" line was planned to start detailing the Castle and City of Greyhawk as Gygax and Kuntz had originally envisioned them; Kuntz would be contributing to what was to be called "Castle Dunfalcon". However, the company fell apart when New Infinities' investors forced it into bankruptcy, and none of this work went into print.

Later RPG projects
On May 16, 2001, Necromancer Games announced a partnership with Rob Kuntz, as they had secured a license to revise his Creations Unlimited adventures for d20. Necromancer Games reprinted the first three Maze adventures in 2001. He also wanted to work on his unpublished and incomplete City of Brass, but due to delays on their publication of the "Maze of Zayene" series, Kuntz ended his relationship with Necromancer. Different Worlds Publications published Kuntz's The Eight Kings (2004), the final book in the four-book adventure series after it was abandoned by Necromancer.

On November 2, 2001, Troll Lord Games announced that they would be publishing books by Rob Kuntz. Troll Lord published Dark Druids (2002), a 1976 adventure by Kuntz which was original set in Greyhawk's Gnarley Forest. This was to be followed by "Codex Germania," the first in a Myths & Legends series but Kuntz found himself too busy with other work to complete his first myth book and thus withdrew from Troll Lord. Kenzer & Company reprinted Garden of the Plant Master (2003) and later published CZA1: Dark Chateau (2005), Kuntz's contribution to Castle Zagyg, which was another iteration of Castle Greyhawk. He began working on his City of Brass with Kenzer, but shattered his leg before finishing the adventure and did not finish it, leaving Kenzer to find another author to finish the book as Sir Robilar's City of Brass (2003) for HackMaster.

Kuntz wrote a series of adventures for Maure Castle, published in Dungeon Magazine:

 Maure Castle: "The Statuary", DUNGEON #112, with Gary Gygax July 2004
 Return to Maure Castle: "Chambers of Antiquities", DUNGEON #124, July 2005
 Return to Maure Castle: "The Greater Halls", DUNGEON #139, October 2006

The Maure Castle created for these magazines was an original work, created as a stand-in for El Raja Key so that Kuntz could continue to protect his IP.

In 2006 he started a new company, Pied Piper Publishing, maintain control of his IP. The company would publish his latest roleplaying adventure modules which were released on a limited-edition basis:

 CZ1: Cairn of the Skeleton King (2006), the company's debut product, an original AD&D adventure. The adventure features artwork by Jim Holloway, former TSR, Inc. artist.
 Tower of Blood (2007), co-authored with Lance Hawvermale

Kuntz began republishing his old campaign materials, including some dungeon levels that were either written for Castle Greyhawk or incorporated into it via Castle El Raja Key; this included RJK1: Bottle City (2007) and The Original Living Room (2007), both of which were parts of the shared Castle Greyhawk.

The following have since been published, including material from the original Lake Geneva Castle & Campaign:

 The Original Living Room (2008)
 The Original Bottle City (2008)
 El Raja Key's Arcane Treasury with Eric N. Shook (2009)
 Daemonic & Arcane (2009)
 The Stalk (2009)
 Dungeon Set #1 - Levels 1-6 with Ramsey Dow (2009)
 Dungeon Set #2 - Levels 7-12 with Ramsey Dow (2009) 
 Black Festival (fiction novella, 2010)

Kuntz closed Pied Piper Publishing in 2010. Kuntz signed a contract with Black Blade Publishing to take up work where he left off on the "Lake Geneva Castle and Campaign dungeon levels". He also began to work with Chaotic Henchmen Productions.

Awards
 1986, Charles S. Roberts Award, Kings & Things board game (West End Games)
 2005, Golden ENnie for Best Adventure, Maure Castle'' in Dungeon Magazine #112 (Paizo Publishing)

References

External links
"Three Line Studio" Rob Kuntz's company, includes updated projects, biography and design philosophy
"A Partial, Annotated Bibliography of the Works of Robert J. Kuntz" from Grodog's Greyhawk Website
"RPGGeek RPG Designer listing for Robert J. Kuntz" 

"Lake Geneva Original RPG Campaign" Kuntz's current gaming blog
"Lord of the Green Dragons" Kuntz's older gaming blog

1955 births
Dungeons & Dragons game designers
Living people
People from Lake Geneva, Wisconsin